Kansk is a town in Krasnoyarsk Krai, Russia, located on both banks of the Kan River. Population:

History and economy
Founded in 1628 as a Russian fort, it was transferred to its current location in 1636 and granted town status in 1782. The town is a center of the Kansk-Achinsk lignite basin, which in the early 1980s was developed into one of the largest coal areas of the Soviet Union. It also has cotton, timber, hydrolysis, and food industries.

Administrative and municipal status
Within the framework of administrative divisions, Kansk serves as the administrative center of Kansky District, even though it is not a part of it. As an administrative division, it is incorporated separately as the krai town of Kansk—an administrative unit with the status equal to that of the districts. As a municipal division, the krai town of Kansk is incorporated as Kansk Urban Okrug.

Miscellaneous
The town is home to the Kansk air base and it is crossed by the Trans-Siberian Railway.

Notable people
Pyotr Slovtsov, tenor
Sasha Trautvein, model

References
 Kansk – Travel guide at Wikivoyage

Notes

Sources

External links

Official website of Kansk 
Kansk Business Directory  

Cities and towns in Krasnoyarsk Krai
Yeniseysk Governorate